"Justice to Believe/Aoi Iro" is the 14th single from Japanese voice actress and singer Nana Mizuki.

The single was ranked No. 4 on the Japanese Oricon charts.

Track listing
Justice to Believe
Lyrics: Nana Mizuki
Composition, arrangement: Noriyasu Agematsu (Elements Garden)
Theme song for PS2 game Wild Arms 5
New rendition for this song is featured in Nana Mizuki's greatest hits album The Museum

Lyrics: Bee
Composition, arrangement: AGENT-MR
Ending theme for a TV Tokyo program
This song is included in Nana Mizuki's 2007 album Great Activity
Justice to Believe (without NANA)
Aoi Iro (without NANA)

Charts

Nana Mizuki songs
2006 singles
Songs written by Nana Mizuki
2006 songs
King Records (Japan) singles